Mestes is a commune in the Corrèze department in central France.

Geography
The river Diège forms all of the commune's eastern boundary.

Population

See also
Communes of the Corrèze department

References

Communes of Corrèze